The Taipei WEGO Private Senior High School is a private senior high school which located at Beitou, Taipei, Taiwan.

See also
 Education in Taiwan
 Taipei Wego Senior High School is a private high school located in Beitou District, Taipei, Taiwan. It has a high school and a central part of the country. The central part of the country recruits 13 classes each year, while in the ninth grade, it still has 12 classes. In the next semester, it will be changed to 12 classes (the international class of the five classes of the five classes in the external examination class will not change), and the thirteenth class in the central part of the country will be established as an international class in 2017. The high school enrolls eight classes each year, of which the class is a multi-class class. In 2012, the class was established as an international class. In 2014, the class was established as a natural science experiment class. In 2017, Duban was established as an international class or a regular class. The total number of seniors in a high school is about 390. He did not participate in the joint registration and distribution of high school and high school in Jibei District, and adopted a separate enrollment system. More than 90% of high school freshmen each year are directly from the central part of the country.

Pastoral teaching is a special course at Weige School. The course implementation level is from kindergarten to high school.

Kindergarten: Two to three times per semester, the course time is one day.

Elementary School: Two to three times per semester, the course time is one day.

Secondary school and high school: Each semester is twice, once a day, once for the Tiantian Ministry of Education.

Direct promotion: A semester is about seven times, the course time is one day, and it is implemented every Tuesday or three.

Tianjiao Department: It is one of the schools' rooms. Director Hou is the leader of Tianjiao Center. The office is located in the top of Zhuzihu Lake in Yangming Mountain.

Painful experience: It was completely destroyed by the impact of Typhoon Nali, including more than half of the animals in the animal area, and all the snakes in the big classroom were missing. Reconstruction of large classrooms and greenhouses after the disaster.

In addition, the illegal behavior of Zhuzihu poison dog and dog has always existed. The dogs that were once raised by the Tianjiao Center were also implicated. Since the incident, the Tianjiao Center has paid more attention to the movements of all animals and avoided the tragedy of innocent life.

Other information: Pastoral teaching is sometimes implemented in other locations. Such as: the racecourse, golf course, boating, riverside resort, etc., will not necessarily be implemented in the Tianjiao Center of Zhuzi Lake in Yangming Mountain.

Educational institutions established in 1993
Schools in Taiwan
1993 establishments in Taiwan